Actual development level refers to how much a child can achieve independently without the assistance of a parents, teachers, or peers.

See also
Potential development level

References

Learning